Hyalobagrus ornatus is a species of bagrid catfish found in Indonesia, Malaysia and Thailand.  It is found in the Muar River drainage in the southern Malay Peninsula of Malaysia and Thailand and Kapuas basin in western Borneo.  It occurs in streams and peat swamps.

References
 

Bagridae
Fish of Asia
Freshwater fish of Indonesia
Freshwater fish of Malaysia
Fish of Thailand
Taxa named by Georg Duncker
Fish described in 1904